The 2006 FIFA World Cup qualification UEFA Group 5 was a UEFA qualifying group for the 2006 FIFA World Cup. The group comprised Belarus, Italy, Moldova, Norway, Scotland and Slovenia.

The group was won by Italy, who qualified for the 2006 FIFA World Cup. The runners-up Norway entered the UEFA qualification play-offs.

Standings

Results

Goalscorers

4 goals

 Vitali Kutuzov
 Luca Toni

3 goals

 Maksim Romaschenko
 Serghei Rogaciov
 John Carew
 Kenny Miller
 Milenko Ačimovič

2 goals

 Vital Bulyga
 Daniele De Rossi
 Alberto Gilardino
 Andrea Pirlo
 Francesco Totti
 Morten Gamst Pedersen
 James McFadden

1 goal

 Valentin Belkevich
 Alyaksandr Kulchiy
 Sergei Omelyanchuk
 Mauro Camoranesi
 Alessandro Del Piero
 Fabio Grosso
 Christian Vieri
 Cristian Zaccardo
 Serghei Dadu
 Alexandru Gațcan
 Thorstein Helstad
 Steffen Iversen
 Claus Lundekvam
 Vidar Riseth
 Sigurd Rushfeldt
 Alexander Ødegaard
 Ole Martin Årst
 Christian Dailly
 Darren Fletcher
 Paul Hartley
 Steven Thompson
 Nastja Čeh
 Boštjan Cesar
 Sebastjan Cimirotič
 Klemen Lavrič
 Matej Mavrič
 Aleksander Rodić
 Anton Žlogar

See also 

5
2004–05 in Italian football
Qual
2004–05 in Scottish football
2005–06 in Scottish football
2004–05 in Slovenian football
2005–06 in Slovenian football
2004–05 in Moldovan football
2005–06 in Moldovan football
2004 in Belarusian football
2005 in Belarusian football
2004 in Norwegian football
2005 in Norwegian football